Abiola Bashorun is a Nigerian model and beauty pageant titleholder, she won the Most Beautiful Girl in Nigeria pageantry in 2006.

In 2006, eighteen-year-old Bashorun was the surprise winner of the annual pageant. As the reigning queen, Baroshun's platform was Sickle Cell Awareness. She was inspired after losing a friend to the disease; she spent most of her reign organising workshops and seminars to educate Nigerians on the disease. She also represented Nigeria at Miss World 2006.

In 2008, Bashorun appeared in a commercial for Motorola. She later went on to study Law in the United Kingdom and later moved back to Nigeria after graduating.

External links

Most Beautiful Girl in Nigeria winners
1980s births
Living people
Yoruba beauty pageant contestants
Miss World 2006 delegates
Nigerian female models
Year of birth missing (living people)
Yoruba people